Sowmaeh-ye Kabudin (also Romanized as Şowma‘eh-ye Kabūdīn) is a village in Kandovan Rural District, Kandovan District, Meyaneh County, East Azerbaijan Province, Iran. At the 2006 census, its population was 209, in 61 families.

References 

Populated places in Meyaneh County